Elliot Bogod (born 1971) is a New York City-based real estate agent, and writer. He is the author of the book Get Rich in Real Estate.

Bogod is the founder of several companies, including the International Real Estate Broadway Realty.

Career
Bogod started working with a brokerage company called Cushman & Wakefield in 1996. He started his own business as a real estate broker and founded Broadway Realty in 1998.

Bogod is also a member of the Real Estate Board of New York and the Realtor Association of Miami-Dade County. Bogod is a member of the Haute Residence website and the Forbes Real Estate Council, where he blogged.

Bibliography

Awards
Nominated 2007 and 2008 Commercial broker all Stars by NY Real Estate Magazine.

Personal life
Bogod is married to Valerie Kritsberg and they both resides in Manhattan with their two children.

References

External links
Elliot Bogod's Breakthrough Success Episode

American real estate brokers
1971 births
Living people
21st-century American businesspeople